This list of governors of Orientale Province includes governors or equivalent officerholders of the original Orientale Province created in the Belgian Congo in 1913, and of the successor provinces until the 2015 break-up of the province into the provinces of Bas-Uélé, Haut-Uélé, Ituri and Tshopo.

Orientale/Oost Province was divided in 1933 into Costermansville Province (later Kivu Province) and Stanleyville Province.
Stanleyville Province was renamed Orientale/Oost Province from 1947 to 1963, when it was broken up into Kibali-Ituri, Uélé and Haut-Congo provinces.
Orientale Province was reconstituted in 1966. It was renamed Haut-Zaïre Province from 1971–1997, then returned to the name of Orientale Province from 1997 to 2015.

First period (1913–1963)

The governors or equivalent of Orientale/Oost Province and Stanleyville Province from 1913 to 1963 were:

Successor provinces (1963–1966)

Between 1963 and 1966 Orientale was broken up into the Kibali-Ituri, Uélé and Haut-Congo provinces.

Kibali-Ituri

The head of Kibali-Ituri Province was:

Uélé

The heads of Uélé Province were:

Haut-Congo

The heads of Haut-Congo Province were:

Second period (1966–2015)

The governors or equivalent of Orientale Province and Haut-Zaïre Province from 1966 to 2015 were:

See also
Lists of provincial governors of the Democratic Republic of the Congo

Notes

References

Governors of provinces of the Democratic Republic of the Congo